Lionel Nathan de Rothschild, OBE (25 January 1882 – 28 January 1942), also Major Lionel de Rothschild, was a British banker and Conservative politician best remembered as the creator of Exbury Gardens by the New Forest in Hampshire. He was the eldest son of Leopold de Rothschild (1845–1917) and a part of the prominent Rothschild banking family of England. In 1910, he was elected to the House of Commons. In 1917, he co-founded the anti-Zionist League of British Jews.

Early life and family

Lionel Nathan de Rothschild was the eldest of the three sons of Leopold de Rothschild (1845–1917) and Marie Perugia (1862–1937). He was born in London and educated at Harrow School and Trinity College, Cambridge, where he graduated BA in 1903 and MA in 1908. On 25 January 1910 he was elected to the House of Commons for the constituency of Aylesbury in Buckinghamshire and was a Member of Parliament until 1923.

In 1912 he married Marie Louise Eugénie Beer (1892–1975). They had the following children:
 Rosemary Leonora Ruth (1913–2013), the first wife of Major Hon Denis Gomer Berry
 Edmund Leopold (1916–2009)
 Naomi Luisa Nina (1920-2007)
 Leopold David (1927–2012)

World War I 

At the outbreak of World War I, Lionel's younger brothers Evelyn and Anthony both joined the British Army. However, as the eldest son he was needed as the heir to take over the family's N M Rothschild & Sons banking house. Much to his frustration, Lionel had no choice but to remain at home.

When Britain entered the War in August 1914, Lionel had already been promoted from captain to major in the Royal Buckinghamshire Yeomanry. As the Government recognized that many Jews yet had not been enlisted in military service, a Central Jewish Recruiting Committee was established in  December 1915. Its office was located at the Rothschild's New Court, which was colloquially known as "Rothschild’s Recruiting Office", while Lionel was appointed vice-chairman. Chairman was Edmund Sebag-Montefiore.

In 1917 he co-founded and headed the anti-Zionist League of British Jews.

Lionel was made OBE in the Military Division in 1917. He was retired from the regiment in 1921. Both of his brothers were wounded in battle, and brother Evelyn died of combat injuries suffered at the 1917 Battle of Mughar Ridge.

Engagement in plants

His father, Leopold, died in early 1917 and Lionel and brother Anthony became the managing partners of N M Rothschild & Sons bank. However, Lionel de Rothschild had developed an interest in horticulture at a very young age and is said to have planted his first garden at the age of five. In 1919, he purchased the Mitford estate at Exbury in Hampshire, where he devoted a great deal of time and money to transform it into one of the finest gardens in all of England, with more than one million plants. In the 1920s, he built Exbury House around an existing structure in a neo-Georgian style. He constructed a private railway to transport rocks to build the largest rock garden in the country.

Lionel de Rothschild also co-sponsored plant-hunting expeditions to places as isolated as the Himalayas to collect seed for plant growth and experimentation. In all, he developed 1,204 new hybrids of rhododendron and azalea that were recognized and sold around the world.

Although he continued to work at the family bank, he is quoted as describing himself as "a banker by hobby — a gardener by profession".

Death
Lionel Nathan de Rothschild died in London, aged sixty, in 1942 and was buried in the Willesden Jewish Cemetery. His son Edmund took over management of the Exbury Gardens and would eventually create a charitable trust to manage the property. In 2001, the American Rhododendron Society recognised Lionel Nathan de Rothschild's significant contribution, posthumously bestowing on  him a Pioneer Achievement Award.

References 

 See the list of references at: Rothschild banking family of England

External links 
 
Letter from Major Lionel de Rothschild to Lord Curzon concerning: Draft mandate for the administration of Palestine: requests copies to be sent to the Executives of the League of British Jews. (catalogue only). The National Archives, UK
Typed letter from Major Lionel de Rothschild to Wollaston of 7 April 1921 asking for share of every rhododendron seed and plant and magnolia seeds in return for subscription of £100 towards Expedition funds., 5 July 1920 (catalogue only). The National Archives, UK

1882 births
1942 deaths
People educated at Harrow School
Alumni of Trinity College, Cambridge
English bankers
English gardeners
English people of German-Jewish descent
Lionel Nathan de Rothschild
English Jews
Liberal Unionist Party MPs for English constituencies
Conservative Party (UK) MPs for English constituencies
UK MPs 1910
UK MPs 1910–1918
UK MPs 1918–1922
UK MPs 1922–1923
Burials at Willesden Jewish Cemetery
Officers of the Order of the British Empire
Royal Buckinghamshire Yeomanry officers
Politicians from London
Jewish British politicians
Victoria Medal of Honour recipients
N M Rothschild & Sons people
20th-century English businesspeople
British Army personnel of World War I
Anti-Zionist Jews